Lukou Town() is an urban town and the seat of Zhuzhou County in Hunan, China.
As of the 2000 census it had a population of 78,000 and an area of 64.7 square kilometers.

Divisions of Zhuzhou County
County seats in Hunan